Huizi may refer to:

Hui Shi (380 BC - 305 BC),  Chinese philosopher
Huizi (currency), banknote of the Chinese Southern Song Dynasty